Chad Harbach (born 1975) is an American writer. An editor at the journal n + 1, he is the author of the 2011 novel The Art of Fielding.

Early life and education
Harbach grew up in Racine, Wisconsin. His father was an accountant and his mother the head of a Montessori school. Harbach graduated from Harvard University, where he befriended fellow writers and journalists Keith Gessen and Benjamin Kunkel. He received an MFA from the University of Virginia in 2004.

n + 1
In 2004, Mark Greif, Gessen, Harbach, Kunkel, and Marco Roth launched the literary journal n + 1; Harbach had come up with the name as early as 1998.<ref>A.O. Scott, "Among the Believers," The New York Times Magazine," September 11, 2005.</ref> Harbach is both an editor and writer for the journal, contributing essays on environmentalism, David Foster Wallace, and the Boston Red Sox.

The Art of Fielding
Harbach worked on his novel The Art of Fielding for nine years. The novel, set at Westish College, a small school on the shore of Lake Michigan, tells the story of the gifted young shortstop Henry Skrimshander, whose errant throw upends the lives of five people. In high school, Harbach had played baseball, along with golf and basketball; in March 2010, he told Bloomberg News, "What fascinates me about baseball is that although it's a team game, and a team becomes a kind of family, the players on the field are each very much alone. Your teammates depend on you and support you, but at the moments that count they can't bail you out."

After a heated auction ($665,000), the book was acquired and published by Little, Brown in the fall of 2011. A Vanity Fair e-book describing the writing and publication of the novel was later released. The Art of Fielding was met with extraordinary critical praise. In The New York Times, Michiko Kakutani wrote, "'The Art of Fielding' is not only a wonderful baseball novel—it zooms immediately into the pantheon of classics, alongside The Natural by Bernard Malamud and The Southpaw by Mark Harris—but it's also a magical, melancholy story about friendship and coming of age that marks the debut of an immensely talented writer."

MFA vs NYC
Harbach edited a book about two American writing cultures, released in February 2014. The book was based on Harbach's widely read essay "MFA vs NYC," and featured essays by n+1 contributors such as Elif Batuman and Keith Gessen, as well as the novelist George Saunders. The Times's Dwight Garner described it as a "serious, helpful and wily book."

Awards and recognition
2011 The Art of Fielding named on The New York Times Best Books of 2011 list
2011 The Art of Fielding named Amazon's Best Book of the Year
2012 Bottari Lattes Grinzane nominee for The Art of Fielding2012 Friends of American Writers Book of the Year for The Art of Fielding2012 The Guardian First Book Award nominee for The Art of Fielding2012 International Dublin Literary Award longlist for The Art of Fielding2012 Library of Virginia Literary Award nominee for The Art of Fielding2012 Los Angeles Times Book Prize nominee for Art Seidenbaum Award for First Fiction for The Art of Fielding2012 Midwest Booksellers Choice Award for The Art of Fielding2012 PEN/Hemingway Foundation Award nominee for The Art of Fielding2012 Wisconsin Library Association Literary Award for The Art of FieldingControversy
In September, 2017, writer Charles C. Green sued Chad Harbach claiming "large-scale misappropriation" by Harbach.  The suit noted a very strong plot and style resemblance between The Art of Fielding and Green's previously completed screenplay, Bucky's 9th. Green claimed Harbach had somehow seen an unpublished version of his manuscript.

In July, 2018, Green's suit was dismissed, though he claimed he intends to appeal.

References

External links
n + 1 Archive Chad Harbach
Chad Harbach and The Art of Fielding on NPR
Chad Harbach discusses writing programs on NPR
The New York Times Book Review on The Art of Fielding
A.O. Scott in The New York Times Magazine on n + 1
 Radio Interview with Chad Harbach on "Read First, Ask Later" (Ep. 26)''

1975 births
Living people
Harvard College alumni
University of Virginia alumni
21st-century American novelists
American male novelists
Writers from Racine, Wisconsin
American editors
21st-century American male writers
Novelists from Wisconsin